Progress M-27 was a Russian unmanned Progress cargo spacecraft, which was launched in April 1995 to resupply the Mir space station.

Launch
Progress M-27 launched on 9 April 1995 from the Baikonur Cosmodrome in Kazakhstan. It used a Soyuz-U rocket.

Docking
Progress M-27 docked with the forward port of the Mir Core Module on 11 April 1995 at 21:00:44 UTC, and was undocked on 22 May 1995 at 23:42:37 UTC.

Decay
It remained in orbit until 23 May 1995, when it was deorbited. The deorbit burn occurred at 02:40:15 UTC and the mission ended at 03:27:52 UTC.

See also

 1995 in spaceflight
 List of Progress missions
 List of uncrewed spaceflights to Mir

References

Progress (spacecraft) missions
1995 in Kazakhstan
Spacecraft launched in 1995
Spacecraft which reentered in 1995
Spacecraft launched by Soyuz-U rockets